The Uruguayan Championship 1927 was the 25th season of Uruguay's top-flight professional football league.

Overview
After two years without an official tournament (1925 and 1926), the 1927 tournament reunited the two associations that divided the Uruguayan football after the schism of 1922. It consisted of a two-wheel championship of all against all. It was attended by 20 teams, with the tournament with the most participants in history. The winner was Rampla Juniors, crowned Uruguayan champion for the first and only time in their history.

Teams

League standings

References
Uruguay - List of final tables (RSSSF)

1928
Uru
1927 in Uruguayan football